Beyond Westworld is a 1980 American television series based on the 1973 film Westworld, which was written and directed by Michael Crichton. Although the DVD box cover mentions that it follows the film's events, it ignored the 1976 film sequel Futureworld.

Synopsis
Security Chief John Moore of the Delos Corporation has to stop the evil scientist Simon Quaid, who is planning to use the robots in Delos to try to take over the world.

Cast
 Jim McMullan as John Moore
 James Wainwright as Simon Quaid
 Connie Sellecca as Pamela Williams
 William Jordan as Joseph Oppenheimer
 Severn Darden as Foley
 Nancy Harewood as Roberta
 Judith Chapman as Laura Garvey (pilot only)

Broadcast and reception
The series was nominated for two Primetime Emmy Awards (Outstanding Achievement in Makeup and Outstanding Art Direction For a Series), though only five episodes were produced. Only three of these episodes aired by CBS before cancellation.

In the United Kingdom all five episodes were shown by some ITV regions separately, starting with Granada Television, which aired the first four episodes between August 2 and 23, 1980 in an early-evening slot, but delayed the fifth until a morning slot on January 7, 1981. Across the nine regions which showed the "full" series, many showed episodes 2–5 in differing random orders, and only Yorkshire Television showed them more than once. Ulster Television only showed two episodes, six months apart. Thames Television aired all five episodes in an early afternoon slot during the summer of 1982.

Home media
On July 29, 2014, Warner Home Video released the complete series on DVD-R in Region 1 via their Warner Archive Collection manufactured-on-demand service.

List of episodes

Awards and nominations

References

External links 
 

Westworld
1980 American television series debuts
1980 American television series endings
1980s American science fiction television series
CBS original programming
Television series about robots
Live action television shows based on films
Television shows based on works by Michael Crichton
Television series by MGM Television
Television series by Warner Bros. Television Studios
Television shows set in Seattle